Budrys is a Lithuanian surname. It evolved from the ancient Lithuanian personal name Budrys. The patronymic surname Budraitis is derived from this given name.

Notable people with the surname include:

Algirdas Budrys (born 1939), Lithuanian musician
Algis Budrys (1931–2008), Lithuanian-American writer
 (born 1976), Lithuanian economist, politician, MP
 (born 1966), Lithuanian radio, TV show and event host and presenter, and politician
Eugenijus Mindaugas Budrys (1925–2007), Lithuanian painter
Ignas Budrys (1933–1999), Lithuanian painter
Jonas Budrys (1889–1964), counterintelligence officer and later a Lithuanian diplomat
Povilas Budrys (born 1962), Lithuanian actor and artist
Viktorija Budrytė-Winnersjo (born 1989), Lithuanian footballer

Fictional characters
Budrys, from Adam Mickiewicz's poem The Three Budrys, who lent his name to a jocular Polish term for "Lithuanian person"

See also

References

Lithuanian-language surnames